The Hannibal Directive (or "Procedure" or "Protocol") is a controversial procedure that Israel Defense Forces (IDF) have used follow to prevent the capture of Israeli soldiers by enemy forces.

It was introduced in 1986, after a number abductions of IDF soldiers in Lebanon and the subsequent controversial prisoner exchanges. The full text of directive has never been published and until 2003 Israeli military censorship even forbade any discussion of the subject in the press. The directive has been changed several times. At one time the formulation was that "the kidnapping must be stopped by all means, even at the price of striking and harming our own forces."

The Hannibal directive have, at times,  apparently existed in two different versions, one top-secret written version, accessible only to the upper echelon of the IDF, and one "oral law" version for division commanders and lower levels. In the latter versions, "by all means" was often interpreted literally, as in "an IDF soldier was "better dead than abducted". In 2011, IDF Chief of Staff Benny Gantz stated the directive does not permit killing IDF soldiers. 

The Hannibal directive has not prevented the capture of a single Israeli soldier. Among the 11 Israelis involved in the seven reported Hannibal incidents, only one soldier (Gilad Shalit) survived. In his case the declaration of Hannibal occurred too late to have any influence on the cause of events. There is however only one case where Israeli forces have been officially confirmed to be directly responsible for an Israeli death.

Background
Israel has with several notable exceptions adhered to the principle of not negotiating with terrorists and this especially in hostage situations. This policy led to some notable successes, such as Operation Entebbe, but also to tragic loss of human life, as in the Maalot Massacre. In cases where Israeli soldiers were captured and no military solution was found, Israel was forced to negotiate with the captors about an exchange of prisoners. Large parts of Israeli public opinion would not accept simply abandoning captured soldiers to their fate.

Already in 1970, the Palestinian movement Fatah managed to sneak over the Lebanese border and abduct a security guard in the northern settlement of Metulla and secure a swap of the guard for a senior member in Fatah, jailed in Israel. In 1979 Israel agreed to swap an Israeli POW in Palestinian hands for 76 convicted militants in Israeli jails.

After the 1982 Lebanon War Palestinian forces were holding nine IDF soldiers as POWs. Six were held by Fatah (the main faction of the PLO) and three by the pro-Syrian PFLP-GC. In 1983, Israel agreed to free 4,700 Palestinian and Lebanese prisoners, including several high ranking PLO officers, against the six Fatah prisoners. The following year Israel accepted to free another 1,150 Palestinian prisoners from Israeli jails. Many of them were allowed to remain in Israeli controlled territory.

The directive
According to Haaretz reporter Leibovich-Dar, the background to the formulation of the directive was the capture of two Israeli soldiers during a Hezbollah ambush in South Lebanon in June 1986. Both soldiers presumably died during the attack, and their bodies were returned to Israel in an exchange with Hezbollah in 1996. The authors of the order were the three top officers of the IDF Northern Command, Major General Yossi Peled, the command's operations officer, Colonel Gabi Ashkenazi, and its intelligence officer, Colonel Yaakov Amidror. The order was top secret, and its mere existence was denied by Israeli military authorities.

On August 1, 2014, the New York Times reported that Hamas had captured an IDF officer and that the IDF had answered with an assault that killed scores of Palestinians. The "Hannibal Directive" was not mentioned in the article. But the paper was contacted by the Israeli military censor and informed that any material related to the missing officer had to be submitted for prior review before publication. The paper had not been subjected to this level of scrutiny for more than six years.

The exact wording of the directive was not known, though Leibovich-Dar claimed that it had been updated several times over the years. The Jerusalem Post Journalist Anshel Pfeffer described the order in 2006 as the "rumored" standard procedure in the eventuality of a kidnap attempt: "soldiers are told, though never officially" the content of this order.

Maariv quoted a version of the directive apparently applicable to 2014:
"A. During a kidnapping, the main task becomes to rescue our soldiers from the abductors, even at the cost of harming or injuring our soldiers.

B. If the abductors and the kidnapped are identified and the calls are not heeded, a firearm must be fired in order to bring the kidnappers to the ground, or arrest them.

D.(sic) If the vehicle or the hijackers do not stop, they should be fired at individually, intentionally, in order to hit the hijackers, even if it means harming our soldiers. 
(This section was accompanied by an asterisk comment emphasizing: "In any case, everything should be done to stop the vehicle and not allow it to escape").

Apparently, the Hannibal directive existed in several versions at that time. It had been amended by the IDF General Staff in October 2013, but neither the corresponding orders at the IDF Southern Command, nor the one at the Gaza Division had been similarly updated by July 2014. The three different, simulaneously current, versions of the directive could therefore be interpreted in many different ways, especially on the sensitive question of the value of a soldier's life.

Although Israeli officials insist that the directive's name was a random computer-generated designation, many observers do not find this convincing. The historic Carthaginian general Hannibal is said to have preferred suicide by poison, rather than being taken prisoner by his Roman enemies.

According to statements by several Israeli officials, the aim of the directive is to prevent the capture of an IDF soldier by enemy forces, even by risking the soldier's life or the lives of scores of non-Israeli civilians. Israeli spokespersons claim that IDF forces are forbidden to attempt to kill a captured soldier, rather than having him captured. Many testimonies from IDF soldiers and other sources contradict this claim and suggest that the IDF in practice adheres to the principle that a dead soldier is better than a captive soldier.

According to the directive, once it has been declared by a field officer, Israeli forces are to open fire on enemy forces carrying away an IDF prisoner. Vehicles suspected of removing such a prisoner from the battlefield may thus be attacked, even at the risk of harming, or even killing, the abductee himself. According to some interpretations, this includes even firing missiles from attack helicopters or firing tank shells at suspected escaping vehicles.

Amos Harel of Haaretz wrote in November 2011 that the Hannibal directive was suspended for a time "due to opposition from the public and reservist soldiers" but was revised and reinstated by IDF Chief-of-Staff Benny Gantz after the abduction of Gilad Shalit in June 2006. The revised order stated that IDF commanders may take whatever action is necessary, even at the risk of endangering the life of an abducted soldier, to foil an abduction, but it does not allow them to kill an abducted Israeli soldier. The new directive gave local field commanders the right to invoke Hannibal and take action, without waiting for superior officers' confirmation.

Former head of Israeli military intelligence (1974–1978) Shlomo Gazit criticised the fact that a low level officer ("a corporal") could invoke the Hannibal Directive, with such potentially far reaching consequences. The invokation of the Hannibal directive in the 2006 Hezbollah cross-border raid had far-reaching consequences. An IDF tank sent in pursuit of the abductors was blown to pieces, killing its crew. Attempts to rescue the bodies of the tank crew led to further IDF losses. By the time the Israeli government convened to decide how to respond to the attack, Israel - according to Gazit - "was already at war".

The Hannibal Directive was officially cancelled in 2016, but a new directive was introduced in its place. Very little is known about its present content or even if it is still called the Hannibal Directive.

Controversy within the army
Dr. Avner Shiftan, an army physician with the rank of major, came across the Hannibal directive while on reserve duty in South Lebanon in 1999. In army briefings he "became aware of a procedure ordering soldiers to kill any IDF soldier if he should be taken captive by Hezbollah. This procedure struck me as being illegal and not consistent with the moral code of the IDF. I understood that it was not a local procedure but originated in the General Staff, and had the feeling that a direct approach to the army authorities would be of no avail, but would end in a cover-up."

He contacted Asa Kasher, the Israeli philosopher noted for his authorship of Israel Defense Forces' Code of Conduct, who "found it difficult to believe that such an order exists" since this "is wrong ethically, legally and morally". He doubted that "there is anyone in the army" believing that 'better a dead soldier than an abducted soldier'. Haaretz article about Dr. Shiftan's experience was the first to be published in an Israeli newspaper.

In contrast to the view of Kasher, the IDF Chief of Staff Shaul Mofaz said in an interview with Israeli daily Yedioth Ahronoth in 1999: "In certain senses, with all the pain that saying this entails, an abducted soldier, in contrast to a soldier who has been killed, is a national problem." Asked whether he was referring to cases like Ron Arad (an Air Force navigator captured in 1986) and Nachshon Wachsman (an abducted soldier killed in 1994 in a failed rescue attempt), he replied "definitely, and not only".

According to Prof. Emanuel Gross, from the Faculty of Law at the University of Haifa, "Orders like that have to go through the filter of the Military Advocate General's Office, and if they were not involved that is very grave", he said. "The reason is that an order that knowingly permits the death of soldiers to be brought about, even if the intentions were different, carries a black flag and is a flagrantly illegal order that undermines the most central values of our social norms".

Harel writes that a kind of "Oral Law" has developed inside IDF, which is supported by many commanders, even at brigade and division level. It goes further than the official order, including the use of tank shells or air strikes. "A dangerous, unofficial interpretation of the protocol has been created," a senior officer told Haaretz. "Intentionally targeting a vehicle in order to kill the abductee is a completely illegal command. The army's senior command must make this clear to officers."

In anticipation of the Gaza War in 2009, Lt. Col. Shuki Ribak, the commander of the Golani Brigade's 51st battalion instructed his soldiers to avoid kidnapping at any cost and even made clear that he expected his soldiers to commit suicide rather than being abducted:

[N]o soldier in Battalion 51 will be kidnapped at any price. At any price. Under any condition. Even if it means that he blows himself with his own grenade together with those trying to capture him. Also even if it means that now his unit has to fire a barrage at the car that they are trying to take him away in.

After a recording of Ribak's instructions was distributed by an anonymous source, the IDF reiterated its denial of having a policy of intentionally killing captured soldiers.

Incidents where the directive was invoked

Shebaa farms (2000)

The Hannibal Directive was invoked in October 2000 after the Hezbollah capture of three Israeli soldiers in the Israeli-occupied Shebaa Farms area. An Israeli border patrol was attacked by a Hezbollah squad with rockets and automatic fire. St.-Sgt. Adi Avitan, St.-Sgt. Benyamin Avraham and St.-Sgt. Omar Sawaid were captured and brought over the ceasefire line into Lebanon by their captors. When the abduction was discovered, the Northern Command ordered a "Hannibal situation". Israeli attack helicopters fired at 26 moving vehicles in the area since they assumed that the abducted soldiers were transported in one of them.

Kerem Shalom crossing (2006)
Tank gunner Cpl. Gilad Shalit was captured by Hamas in a cross-border raid from Gaza 25 June 2006. Two IDF soldiers were killed in the attack and another two were wounded. Shalit was held for five years, before being exchanged for 1,027 Palestinian prisoners held in Israeli jails, which was the highest number released for a single Israeli prisoner. According to the Israeli commission of inquiry, headed by Giora Eiland, the Hannibal directive was declared more than an hour after the capture. By that time, Shalit and his captors were already well inside the Gaza strip. The declaration of Hannibal therefore had few practical consequences.

Ayta ash-Shaab (2006)
On 12 July 2006, two Israeli soldiers, Ehud Goldwasser and Eldad Regev, were captured by Hezbollah in an ambush, in which three other soldiers were killed. The Hannibal directive was invoked and a force consisting of tanks and Armored Personnel Carriers was sent across the border to capture a Hezbollah post and block the exit routes out of the town of Ayta ash-Sha’b. A Merkava II main battle tank however ran over a powerful explosive charge and was totally destroyed and its four crewmen killed. The rescue mission was therefore aborted. An eighth IDF soldier was killed trying to retrieve the bodies of the tank crew. The Hannibal directive triggered instant aerial surveillance and airstrikes inside Lebanon to limit Hezbollah's ability to move the soldiers it had seized. "If we had found them, we would have hit them, even if it meant killing the soldiers," a senior Israeli official said. The bodies of the two soldiers were returned in an exchange with Hezbollah in July 2008.

Erez Crossing (2009)
In 2009 Israeli civilian Yakir Ben-Melech was shot dead by Israeli security guards while trying to enter the Gaza Strip from Israel, by jumping the fence at the Erez crossing. In the Israeli press the man was described as a mentally disturbed Israeli citizen, who wanted to contact Hamas, so as to secure the release of Israeli captive Gilad Shalit. Officially, Ben-Melech was mistakenly identified as a potential terrorist.

According to a report by Israeli radio the Hannibal procedure was declared and Ben-Melech was shot to death when he refused to stop. Chief of Staff of the Southern Command, Brig.-Gen. Zvika Fogel commented: "We can't afford now any soul mate of Gilad Shalit" Apparently, Ben-Melech was killed, not by IDF soldiers, but by members of a private security firm, responsible for security at the Erez gate.

Gaza (2008–09) 
During the 2008–2009 Gaza war, an unidentified Israeli soldier was shot and injured by a Hamas fighter during a search of a house in one of the neighbourhoods of Gaza. The Hannibal directive was declared. The wounded soldiers' comrades evacuated the house due to fears that it was booby-trapped. According to testimony by soldiers who took part in the incident the house was then shelled to prevent the wounded soldier from being captured alive by Hamas. According to the IDF spokesman, however, the soldier was already dead, killed by terrorist gun fire.

Rafah (2014) 
During Israel's offensive military operation launched in 2014, the third major offensive launched by Israel in Gaza since 2008, IDF Givati Brigade Lieutenant Hadar Goldin was captured by Hamas soldiers after a brief skirmish on August 1. Despite announcing a 72-hour ceasefire agreement earlier that same day, Israel reportedly initiated the Hannibal Directive in an onslaught later dubbed "Black Friday." The IDF carried out a relentless air and ground attack on residential areas of Rafah in order to carry out the Hannibal Directive and attempt to foil the capture of Lt. Goldin. A 2015 joint report by Amnesty International and Forensic Architecture found that Israel's indiscriminate violence against all human life amounted to war crimes. That report, along with the United Nations' investigation, details the massive Israeli bombardment that killed between 135 and 200 Palestinian civilians, including 75 children, in the three hours following the suspected capture of the one Israeli soldier. Israel's large-scale military onslaught during the declared ceasefire was reported by Haaretz to be the "most devastating" execution of the Hannibal Directive to date.

In December 2014, audio recordings from the IDF's communication system were obtained by Ynet. This evidence, in addition to the July 2015 release of full transcripts from the IDF's communication system, reveal the initiation of the Hannibal Directive. However, an IDF investigation denied that the "Hannibal Procedure" was implemented, despite admitting to using the phrase on IDF field radios. The IDF investigation concluded that 41 people were killed, 12 of them Hamas combatants. Asa Kasher, a winner of the Israel Prize and the author of the IDF's ethical code, contradicted the IDF's report while speaking at a conference of the Tzohar Zionist rabbinical organization. Kasher stated that a soldier had been killed during the summer of 2014 by his comrades due to a mistaken understanding of the directive, and Kasher intimated that the soldier was Lt. Goldin.

Testimonies from IDF soldiers involved in the attack provide further evidence against the IDF's official story. An Israeli army infantry officer described the events of August 1 to Israeli NGO Breaking the Silence: "The minute 'Hannibal Directive' is declared on the radio, there are consequences. There's a fire procedure called the 'Hannibal fire procedure' – you fire at every suspicious place that merges with a central route. You don't spare any means." He reported that the initial burst of fire lasted three hours. An artillery soldier said his battery was "firing at a maximum fire rate" right into inhabited areas. According to the Givati Brigade inquiry, more than 2,000 bombs, missiles and shells were fired in Rafah on 1 August 2014, including 1,000 in the three hours following the capture.

Shuja'iyya (2014)

During the Battle of Shuja'iyya, on July 20, 2014, Hamas fired an anti-tank missile at an IDF armored personnel carrier carrying 7 soldiers, including St.-Sgt. Oron Shaul.  Hamas rapidly claimed to have captured an IDF soldier named Aron Shaul, backing up its claim with the soldier's "photo ID and credentials".  The IDF later confirmed that the body of Oron Shaul had not been identified among the dead found inside the vehicle.
It is unclear if Shaul was captured alive or dead or whether the Hannibal directive was invoked or not.

The second case concerned St.-Sgt. Guy Levy who was killed on July 25. According to the IDF, Levy was killed by an anti-tank missile.
Apparently, his body could not be found and the Hannibal directive was reportedly invoked in this incidence.

Reactions

See also
Israel Defense Forces Code of Conduct
Dahiya doctrine

References

External links 
 The IDF Hannibal Protocol Golani Battalion 51 commander briefing his troops on the eve of their entry into Gaza during Operation Cast Lead. Video report broadcast on Israel Television Channel 2 News, 16 October 2011.
 The Hannibal Directive, documentary by Benny Brunner, al-Jazeera English.  7 October 2016.

Israel Defense Forces
Military tactics
Hostage rescue operations
Prisoners of war